A nova (: novae or novas) is a transient astronomical event that causes the sudden appearance of a bright, apparently "new" star (hence the name "nova", which is Latin for "new") that slowly fades over weeks or months. Causes of the dramatic appearance of a nova vary, depending on the circumstances of the two progenitor stars. All observed novae involve white dwarfs in close binary systems. The main sub-classes of novae are classical novae, recurrent novae (RNe), and dwarf novae. They are all considered to be cataclysmic variable stars.

Classical nova eruptions are the most common type. They are likely created in a close binary star system consisting of a white dwarf and either a main sequence, subgiant, or red giant star. When the orbital period falls in the range of several days to one day, the white dwarf is close enough to its companion star to start drawing accreted matter onto the surface of the white dwarf, which creates a dense but shallow atmosphere. This atmosphere, mostly consisting of hydrogen, is thermally heated by the hot white dwarf and eventually reaches a critical temperature causing ignition of rapid runaway fusion.

The sudden increase in energy expels the atmosphere into interstellar space creating the envelope seen as visible light during the nova event. Such were taken in past centuries to be a new star. A few novae produce short-lived nova remnants, lasting for perhaps several centuries. Recurrent nova processes are the same as the classical nova, except that the fusion ignition may be repetitive because the companion star can again feed the dense atmosphere of the white dwarf.

Novae most often occur in the sky along the path of the Milky Way, especially near the observed Galactic Center in Sagittarius; however, they can appear anywhere in the sky. They occur far more frequently than galactic supernovae, averaging about ten per year in the Milky Way. Most are found telescopically, perhaps only one every 12–18 months reaching naked-eye visibility. Novae reaching first or second magnitude occur only several times per century. The last bright nova was V1369 Centauri reaching 3.3 magnitude on 14 December 2013.

Etymology 
During the sixteenth century, astronomer Tycho Brahe observed the supernova SN 1572 in the constellation Cassiopeia. He described it in his book De nova stella (Latin for "concerning the new star"), giving rise to the adoption of the name nova. In this work he argued that a nearby object should be seen to move relative to the fixed stars, and that the nova had to be very far away. Although this event was a supernova and not a nova, the terms were considered interchangeable until the 1930s. After this, novae were classified as classical novae to distinguish them from supernovae, as their causes and energies were thought to be different, based solely in the observational evidence.

Although the term "stella nova" means "new star", novae most often take place as a result of white dwarfs, which are remnants of extremely old stars.

Stellar evolution of novae 

Evolution of potential novae begins with two main sequence stars in a binary system. One of the two evolves into a red giant, leaving its remnant white dwarf core in orbit with the remaining star. The second star—which may be either a main sequence star or an aging giant—begins to shed its envelope onto its white dwarf companion when it overflows its Roche lobe. As a result, the white dwarf steadily captures matter from the companion's outer atmosphere in an accretion disk, and in turn, the accreted matter falls into the atmosphere. As the white dwarf consists of degenerate matter, the accreted hydrogen does not inflate, but its temperature increases. Runaway fusion occurs when the temperature of this atmospheric layer reaches ~20 million K, initiating nuclear burning, via the CNO cycle.

Hydrogen fusion may occur in a stable manner on the surface of the white dwarf for a narrow range of accretion rates, giving rise to a super soft X-ray source, but for most binary system parameters, the hydrogen burning is unstable thermally and rapidly converts a large amount of the hydrogen into other, heavier chemical elements in a runaway reaction, liberating an enormous amount of energy. This blows the remaining gases away from the surface of the white dwarf surface and produces an extremely bright outburst of light.

The rise to peak brightness may be very rapid, or gradual. This is related to the speed class of the nova; yet after the peak, the brightness declines steadily. The time taken for a nova to decay by around 2 or 3 magnitudes from maximum optical brightness is used for classification, via its speed class. Fast novae typically will take fewer than 25 days to decay by 2 magnitudes, while slow novae will take more than 80 days.

Furthermore, only five percent of the accreted mass is fused during the power outburst. Nonetheless, this is enough energy to accelerate nova ejecta to velocities as high as several thousand kilometers per second—higher for fast novae than slow ones—with a concurrent rise in luminosity from a few times solar to 50,000–100,000 times solar. In 2010 scientists using NASA's Fermi Gamma-ray Space Telescope discovered that a nova also can emit gamma-rays (>100 MeV).

Potentially, a white dwarf can generate multiple novae over time as additional hydrogen continues to accrete onto its surface from its companion star. An example is RS Ophiuchi, which is known to have flared seven times (in 1898, 1933, 1958, 1967, 1985, 2006, and 2021). Eventually, the white dwarf could explode as a Type Ia supernova if it approaches the Chandrasekhar limit.

Occasionally, novae are bright enough and close enough to Earth to be conspicuous to the unaided eye. The brightest recent example was Nova Cygni 1975. This nova appeared on 29 August 1975, in the constellation Cygnus about five degrees north of Deneb, and reached magnitude 2.0 (nearly as bright as Deneb). The most recent were V1280 Scorpii, which reached magnitude 3.7 on 17 February 2007, and Nova Delphini 2013. Nova Centauri 2013 was discovered 2 December 2013 and so far, is the brightest nova of this millennium, reaching magnitude 3.3.

Helium novae 
A helium nova (undergoing a helium flash) is a proposed category of nova events that lacks hydrogen lines in its spectrum. This may be caused by the explosion of a helium shell on a white dwarf. The theory was first proposed in 1989, and the first candidate helium nova to be observed was V445 Puppis in 2000. Since then, four other novae have been proposed as helium novae.

Occurrence rate and astrophysical significance 

Astronomers estimate that the Milky Way experiences roughly 30 to 60 novae per year, but a recent examination has found the likely improved rate of about 50±27. The number of novae discovered in the Milky Way each year is much lower, about 10, probably due to distant novae being obscured by gas and dust absorption. Roughly 25 novae brighter than about the twentieth magnitude are discovered in the Andromeda Galaxy each year and smaller numbers are seen in other nearby galaxies.  As of 2019, 407 probable novae are recorded in the Milky Way.

Spectroscopic observation of nova ejecta nebulae has shown that they are enriched in elements such as helium, carbon, nitrogen, oxygen, neon, and magnesium. The contribution of novae to the interstellar medium is not great; novae supply only  as much material to the Galaxy as do supernovae, and only  as much as red giant and supergiant stars.

Observed recurrent novae such as RS Ophiuchi (those with periods on the order of decades) are rare. Astronomers theorize, however, that most, if not all, novae are recurrent, albeit on time scales ranging from 1,000 to 100,000 years. The recurrence interval for a nova is less dependent on the accretion rate of the white dwarf than on its mass; with their powerful gravity, massive white dwarfs require less accretion to fuel an eruption than lower-mass ones. Consequently, the interval is shorter for high-mass white dwarfs.

V Sagittae is unusual in that we can predict now that it will go nova in approximately 2083, plus or minus about 11 years.

On 27 May 2020, astronomers reported that classical novae explosions are galactic producers of the element lithium.

Subtypes 
Novae are classified according to the light curve development speed, so in 
 NA: fast novae, with a rapid brightness increase, followed by a brightness decline of 3 magnitudes — to about  brightness — within 100 days.
 NB: slow novae, with magnitudes of 3, decline in 150 days or more.
 NC: very slow novae, also known as symbiotic novae, staying at maximum light for a decade or more and then fading very slowly.
 NR/RN: recurrent novae, novae with two or more eruptions separated by 10–80 years have been observed.

Remnants

Some novae leave behind visible nebulosity, material expelled in the nova explosion or in multiple explosions.

Novae as distance indicators 
Novae have some promise for use as standard candle measurements of distances. For instance, the distribution of their absolute magnitude is bimodal, with a main peak at magnitude −8.8, and a lesser one at −7.5. Novae also have roughly the same absolute magnitude 15 days after their peak (−5.5). Comparisons of nova-based distance estimates to various nearby galaxies and galaxy clusters with those measured with Cepheid variable stars, have shown them to be of comparable accuracy.

Recurrent nova 
A recurrent nova (RNe) is an object that has been seen to experience multiple nova eruptions.  as well as several extragalactic ones (in the Andromeda Galaxy (M31) and the Large Magellanic Cloud). One of these extragalactic novae, M31N 2008-12a, erupts as frequently as once every 12 months. The recurrent nova typically brightens by about 8.6 magnitudes, whereas a classic nova may brighten by more than 12 magnitudes.  Although it is estimated that as many as a quarter of nova systems experience multiple eruptions, only ten recurrent novae have been observed in the Milky Way.  The ten known galactic recurrent novae are listed below.

Extragalactic novae 

Novae are relatively common in the Andromeda Galaxy (M31). Approximately several dozen novae (brighter than about apparent magnitude 20) are discovered in M31 each year. The Central Bureau for Astronomical Telegrams (CBAT) tracked novae in M31, M33, and M81.

See also

References

Further reading 
      67.48.28.33

External links 

 
 
 General Catalog of Variable Stars, Sternberg Astronomical Institute, Moscow
 AAVSO Variable Star of the Month. Novae: May 2001 
 Extragalactic Novae

 
Stellar phenomena
Astronomical events